Steven Küchler (born November 5, 1975 in Schmölln, Thuringia) is a boxer from Germany, who is nicknamed Mr. Hollywood.

Amateur
He represented his native country at the 2000 Summer Olympics in Sydney, Australia. 
There he was stopped in the quarterfinals of the Men's Welterweight Division (– 67 kg) division by Romania's eventual bronze medalist Dorel Simion. Out of 261 amateur fights, he won 234.

Professional Boxer
Küchler began his professional boxing career in 2002, representing the box promotion "Universum" and after 7 fights and several injuries, he decided to retire from boxing in 2004. In 2010, he made a comeback in the middleweight division.

Work as a trainer
Steven Küchler is now working with several professional and amateur boxers, including triple world champion Nicole Wesner, who is holding world champion titles of WBF, WIBF and GBU.

References
sports-reference

Website Steven Küchler

1975 births
Living people
People from Schmölln
Welterweight boxers
Boxers at the 2000 Summer Olympics
Olympic boxers of Germany
Sportspeople from Thuringia
German male boxers